Chuck Norris Superkicks is a video game produced by Xonox in 1984. It was later sold as Kung Fu Superkicks when the license for the use of the name Chuck Norris expired. The game was produced for the Commodore 64, VIC-20, Atari 2600, and ColecoVision as part of Xonox's double-ender cartridge line (cartridges with two games and two connectors that were flipped over depending on which one the user wanted to play).

Gameplay
In Chuck Norris Superkicks, Norris must reach a monastery within six minutes. The player controls Chuck Norris on a vertically-scrolling overworld. Norris must walk along a path, and if he steps in the grass, time is lost at a faster rate. Warriors ambush Norris as he walks, causing him to enter battle.

While in battle, Norris faces three enemies, one at a time, who run back and forth and throw shurikens. If an enemy hits Norris, he is knocked down and vulnerable to attacks. If a shuriken hits him, the player loses time and Norris is sent back to the start of the path. Norris has three moves: punch, kick, and block. The block protects Norris from shurikens, while the punches and kicks must be chosen depending on which part of the enemy's body is exposed.

After defeating some enemies, Norris reaches a checkpoint and a split in the path, along with getting a new belt and an extra minute on the timer. At the next checkpoint, accessible after fighting more enemies and going further down the path, Norris unlocks a new attack that replaces the block and works against every enemy.

At the monastery, Norris fights multiple ninjas, who can turn invisible. The game ends when time runs out.

Plot
Chuck Norris must reach an ancient monastery to rescue a famous leader being held hostage. Dangerous warriors lie in waiting to stop him.

References

1984 video games
Action video games
Commodore 64 games
Atari 2600 games
ColecoVision games
VIC-20 games
Video games based on real people
Cultural depictions of Chuck Norris
Video games developed in the United States